The Château de Montfort-sur-Risle was a castle in Montfort-sur-Risle, Eure, France.

Hugues I de Montfort built the castle in 1035 along the road between Pont-Audemer and Brionne. It was destroyed after a siege by King John of England in 1204.

References
Stéphane William Gondoin. Les châteaux forts au temps de Guillaume le Conquérant. September 2015

Castles in Eure
Ruined castles in Normandy